Ringgold is an unincorporated community in Jefferson County, in the U.S. state of Pennsylvania.

History
Ringgold was founded around 1847. A post office has been in operation at Ringgold since 1847.

References

Unincorporated communities in Jefferson County, Pennsylvania
Unincorporated communities in Pennsylvania